Kulachi Tehsil is a tehsil located in Dera Ismail Khan District, Khyber Pakhtunkhwa, Pakistan.

Administration
The tehsil is administratively subdivided into 15 Union Councils, one of which forms the headquarters - Kulachi.

History
During British rule Kulachi was a tehsil of the old Dera Ismail Khan District. It was described as follows in the Imperial Gazetteer of India:

In appearance the tract bears a generic resemblance to the Dera Ismail Khan tahsil, except for the stony plain and the line of barren and unsightly hills which form its western border. The plain is much cleft by deep channels which carry off the rainwater from the hills, and these are utilized for irrigation with great skill. The population in 1901 was 55,053, compared with 52,270 in 1891. The headquarters are at Kulachi (population, 9,125), and the tehsil also contains 81 villages. The land revenue and cesses in 1903-4 amounted to Rs. 96,000. The main language of the tehsil is Saraiki and Pashto.

References

Populated places in Dera Ismail Khan District
Tehsils of Khyber Pakhtunkhwa